Arthur Lawrence Haliburton, 1st Baron Haliburton  (26 December 1832 – 21 April 1907) was a Canadian-born British civil servant. He was the first native Canadian to be raised to the Peerage of the United Kingdom.

Early life

Haliburton was born in Windsor, Nova Scotia, on 26 December 1832.
He was the son of the Anglo-Canadian author and barrister, and British MP, Thomas Chandler Haliburton, and Louisa Neville, who was the daughter of Captain Laurence Neville. He was a brother of Robert Grant Haliburton.
He graduated from the University of King's College, Nova Scotia, with a Doctor of Civil Law (DCL). He was called to the bar, in Nova Scotia, in 1855, but subsequently received a commission into the British Army. He served as a civil commissary for the British Army in Turkey, during the Crimean War, in Canada, and in London, before his appointment, in 1869, as assistant director of supplies and transports, at which he resigned his commission in the army and formally entered the Civil Service.

Civil Service career
Haliburton was Director of Supplies and Transport at the War Office from 1878 to 1888, Assistant Under-Secretary of State for War from 1888 to 1895 and Under-Secretary at the War Office from 1895 to 1897. 
He was made a Deputy Lieutenant of the County of London in 1893, and served as a Justice of the Peace.

He was appointed a Companion of the Order of the Bath (CB) in 1880, a Knight Commander of the Order of the Bath (KCB) in 1885.

In May 1891, Haliburton was made Assistant Under-Secretary for War, and from 1895 to 1897, he served as Permanent Under-Secretary for War.

He was invested as a Knight Grand Cross of the Order of the Bath (GCB) in 1897. On 21 April 1898, Haliburton was raised to the peerage as Baron Haliburton, of Windsor, in the Province of Nova Scotia and Dominion of Canada. Haliburton was the first native Canadian to be raised to the Peerage of the United Kingdom.

Personal life
 Lord Haliburton married Mariana Emily, daughter of the merchant banker Leo Schuster, on 3 November 1877, but they had no children. His wife had been married to Sir William Clay, 2nd Baronet since 1855, until Clay's death in 1876. Haliburton and his wife lived at 57 Lowndes Square, London, England. Haliburton died on 21 April 1907 at Branksome Towers Hotel, Bournemouth, Hampshire. He is buried in Brompton Cemetery, London. The barony became extinct on his death.

References

Sources

1832 births
1907 deaths
Burials at Brompton Cemetery
Barons in the Peerage of the United Kingdom
Permanent Under-Secretaries of State for War
Pre-Confederation Canadian emigrants to the United Kingdom
Canadian people of Scottish descent
Deputy Lieutenants of the County of London
English justices of the peace
Knights Grand Cross of the Order of the Bath
University of King's College alumni
People from Windsor, Nova Scotia
Persons of National Historic Significance (Canada)
British expatriates in the Ottoman Empire
Peers of the United Kingdom created by Queen Victoria